Box game may refer to: 

 Box-making game, a game in which players picks elements from pairwise-disjoint sets (boxes), trying to pick all elements of an entire set
 Black Box (game), a board-game which simulates shooting rays into a black box to deduce the locations of "atoms" hidden inside
 Dots and Boxes, a pencil-and-paper game in which players take turns adding lines between unjoined adjacent dots, trying to create squares
 Hot box (game), a sport in which teams try to hit a flying disc into a pre-specified box
 The Orange Box, a video game compilation by Valve
 Jury Box (game), a parlour game from the 1930s
 The Box (game show), a 2015 British cookery game show
 Candy Box!, a 2013 video game

See also
Game box (disambiguation)